The Military Honour Guard Battalion is the main ceremonial battalion of the Vietnam People's Army. The battalion was established on 1944, prior to the establishment of the Democratic Republic of Vietnam.

Overview

The battalion has taken part in the welcoming of heads of state, heads of government, and senior government delegations, as well as taken part in functions related to the Communist Party of Vietnam, the state and the army. The battalion has also taken part in many national events, such as:

 National Day parade
 6th ASEAN summit (1998)
 II ASEAN Para Games (2003)
 XXII Southeast Asian Games (2003)
 5th ASEM summit (2004)
16th ASEAN Summit (2010)
Millennial Anniversary of Hanoi (2010)
11th National Congress of the Communist Party of Vietnam (2011)
12th National Congress of the Communist Party of Vietnam (2016)
 25th APEC summit (2017)

The battalion also protects the embalmed body of Ho Chi Minh at his mausoleum for 24 hours.

Structure

General Staff Command: Provides honour guards during visits of foreign leaders, the National Day parade, remembrance days, and state funerals.
Ho Chi Minh Mausoleum Command: Guards the Ho Chi Minh Mausoleum in Hanoi.
Military Band of the General Staff Command: The band serves during ceremonial duties in connection with the battalion. It is the successor to the Liberation Army band commanded by Đinh Ngọc Liên, which on the day of the republic's founding in September 1945, performed during the Proclamation of Independence at Ba Đình Square and performing Tiến Quân Ca for the first time. Many members of the band studied at the Hanoi University School of Culture. The modern band was established in 1997, initially with only 9 musicians on the beginner level.

Gallery

External links

Videos
 The battalion at its training barracks

 A ceremony in honour of the battalion

 The 70th anniversary of the battalion
 A flag raising ceremony involving the battalion

Sources

Guards of honour
Military units and formations of the People's Army of Vietnam
Military units and formations established in 1944